Walliswil may refer to:

 Walliswil bei Niederbipp
 Walliswil bei Wangen - Swiss communities, separated by a river